Candles Long Ago is the 14th album by popular children's entertainers Sharon, Lois & Bram, originally released in 1993. It is the first, and only, Chanukah album produced by the trio. Unlike other Sharon, Lois & Bram albums, Candles Long Ago is a miniature album featuring only eleven songs, of which many appear on their previous album Candles, Snow & Mistletoe and one from their second album, Smorgasbord. O It was sold as part of the Sharon, Lois & Bram mini collection at a cheaper price than the trio's regular full-length albums.

Releases
The Canadian edition released in 1994 under Elephant Records only featured seven of the trio's songs, which all appeared (with the exception of one) on the trio's earlier Christmas & Holiday recording, Candles, Snow & Mistletoe. Later that year, Candles Long Ago was picked up by the American Drive Entertainment and released in the United States. The American version, however, featured a total of eleven songs, adding a specially recorded song, Oy Vey to the album as well as three previously recorded songs: Tzena, Tzena from the trio's Sing A to Z recording. Chirri Bim from their 1979, Smorgasbord and Old King Cole/Der Rebbe Elimelech from their Mainly Mother Goose album.

1994 Elephant Records / Drive Entertainment Inc.

Nominations & Awards

Parent's Choice Award (1995)
Our Choice Award – Canadian Children's Book Center (1994)

Track listing
U.S. Version:
"Candles Long Ago"
"I'm A Little Latke"
"Dredyl, Dreydl"
"Oy Chanukah"
"Chirri Bim"
"A Winter Sweet"
"Tzena, Tzena"
"Don't Bring An Elephant (To A Family Meal)"
"Old King Cole / Der Rebbe Elimelech"
"Oy Vey"
"Candles Long Ago (Reprise)"

1994 albums
Sharon, Lois & Bram albums